The 2018 Overwatch League All-Star Game was the Overwatch League's (OWL) first edition of an all-star game that matched the top players in the Atlantic Division (ATL) against those in the Pacific Division (PAC). The game was played on August 26, 2018 at Blizzard Arena in Burbank, California and was the culmination of the league's All-Star Weekend. The Atlantic took the first All-Star title by defeating the Pacific by a score of 4–1. The game was televised by Disney XD and ESPN3 and streamed live on Twitch.

All-Star Game 
The All-Star Game was a five-map match between players from the Atlantic Division and Pacific Division using standard competitive settings. All 18 players on each team were required to have play-time, and substitutions were allowed between each map change.

Rosters and coaches 
The rosters and coaches for the All-Star game were selected through a voting process. The starters were chosen by the fans, with voting beginning on June 1 and ending on June 17. Out of the two DPS, two tank, two support, and two flex players in each division with the highest cumulative vote, the top six players with the highest cumulative vote were named their division's All-Star starters. After the starting rosters were announced, an additional 12 players from each division were selected as reserves by Overwatch League players, coaches, casters, and staffers.

The All-Star Game starters were announced on June 22. In the Atlantic Division, four of the six starters were represented by New York Excelsior, and in the Pacific, two of the six starters were represented by Seoul Dynasty. The All-Star reserves were announced on July 10. London Spitfire had the most reserve players in the Atlantic Division, with four out of twelve of the spots, and Los Angeles Valiant lead the Pacific Division with five out of twelve reserve spots.

Replacement Player selection due to injury or vacancy
Injured/suspended player; selected but did not participate
Retired player; selected but did not participate
Promoted to starter due to injury/vacancy
Traded to new team before All-Star Game
Source: Overwatch League

Game summary

All-Star Weekend
The season's All-Star Skill Matches took place on August 25, 2018.

Lúcioball Showdown
The Atlantic and Pacific teams competed in a 3v3 best-of-three series using standard Lúcioball settings on the Busan Lúcioball Arena map. Each match lasted five minutes; if a match was tied at the end of five minutes, then a sudden death overtime would begin, and the next goal would win.

Mystery Heroes
The Atlantic and Pacific teams competed in a 6v6 Mystery Heroes game using standard competitive settings in a best-of-three series on control maps Nepal, Ilios, and Lijiang Tower. Players are assigned a random hero at the start of each map and a new random hero after each non-self-inflicted death.

Widowmaker 1v1
The coaches of the Atlantic and Pacific Divisions selected their four best Widowmaker players for this tournament. The four players competed head-to-head to determine one Atlantic and one Pacific champion, which played each other in the finals. Every match-up prior to the finals was first-to-seven eliminations, while the final was first-to-nine eliminations. Eliminations were head-shot only, and automatic firing was disabled. There were no capture points, but after 30 seconds, player locations were visible to both players. A match would result in a draw after five minutes. The matches were played on Castillo (quarterfinals), Necropolis (semifinals), and Ecopoint: Antartica (final).

Talent Takedown
Prior to All-Star Weekend, the Atlantic and Pacific coaches drafted two teams of casters and analysts. The two teams squared off in a 6v6 best-of-three series using standard competitive settings. The match started on Hybrid map King's Row, after which the team that lost the select the second map. If the series were to be tied 1-1, a game of Lúcioball would have been the tiebreaker. Overwatch League players helped call the game along with the casters and analysts not playing.

Lockout Elimination
The Atlantic and Pacific teams squared off in this 6v6 competition using standard lockout elimination settings. The winner was determined in a best-of-three series. The maps for this mode were Oasis University, Necropolis, and Castillo.

Charity cheer 
During the All-Star Weekend, 100% of all "Cheers", a special form of emoticon purchased as a microtransaction, on Twitch while watching any of the Overwatch League channels were donated to Child's Play, a charitable organization that donates toys and games to children's hospitals worldwide. At the conclusion of the weekend, viewers raised $34,304.37 for the charity.

Broadcasting
The entire All-Star Weekend was televised nationally by ESPN3 and Disney XD and live-streamed on Twitch, the Overwatch League website, and Major League Gaming.

References 

All-Star
Overwatch League